The Meadows School is a non-profit, coeducational, nonsectarian, independent college preparatory day school located in the Summerlin area of Las Vegas, Nevada. The campus serves just under 900 students in grades pre-k through 12 spread among four divisions – Beginning School (Pre-K), Lower School (Grades K-5), Middle School (Grades 6-8), and Upper School (Grades 9-12).

For the 2019-20 school year, The Meadows has an estimated enrollment of 864 students and a teaching staff of 97 faculty, with an average student to faculty ratio of 11:1. Class sizes are limited to 18 students in the Beginning and Upper Schools and 20 students in the Lower and Middle Schools.

The Upper School offers students 21 AP courses and in 2019 had 31 National AP Scholars or AP Scholars with Distinction. In 2016, The Washington Post named The Meadows School the #2 most challenging high school in Nevada, and the #97 most challenging private high school in the country. Since its first Upper School Commencement in 1991, 100 percent of graduates from The Meadows School have been accepted into four-year colleges or universities.

History

Meadows Lane temporary campus 
At the time that The Meadows School opened in 1984, a permanent campus site had not yet been found. In lieu of a permanent location, Goodman raised $300,000 and purchased 5,000 square feet of temporary modular buildings that were set up on a parking lot behind a car dealership. The lot was loaned to the School by Board Member Fletcher Jones, Jr. and was located, coincidentally, on Meadows Lane in northern Las Vegas. These buildings served as the School’s classrooms until the permanent campus was opened four years later.

Scholar Lane permanent campus 
In 1985, Carolyn Goodman was introduced to William Lummis, the nephew of Howard Hughes and the Chairman of the Board for the Summa Corporation (rebranded as the Howard Hughes Corporation in 1994). The Summa Corporation was in the early stages of developing the northwest area of Las Vegas, later known as Summerlin. Recognizing the correlation between strong communities and good schools, the Summa Corproation donated 40 acres of undeveloped land to the School for a permanent campus.

Construction on the new campus began in the fall of 1987. The permanent campus was situated on Scholar Lane, a street name chosen by the students for their new school. While the construction of the Summerlin campus was underway, the Summa Corporation also provided additional funding to the School to add new modular buildings to the temporary campus to accommodate its growing student enrollment, which by 1987 had increased to 200 students in grades K-8.

One year later, at the beginning of the 1988 school year, Lower School students moved into The LeOre Cobbley Lower School building on the new campus. Middle and Upper School students followed suit in December of that year and moved into classrooms created from the previous modular buildings on Meadows Lane, which had been relocated to the permanent campus.

Athletics

Interscholastic sports 
The Meadows School is a member of the Nevada Interscholastic Activities Association (NIAA) Southern conference and participates in athletics at the Division III level (with the exception of its Tennis and Bowling Teams, which compete in Division I-A). It offers students a variety of interscholastic sports to choose from, including football, soccer, volleyball, cheer, tennis, and cross country in the fall season; basketball, cheer, wrestling, and bowling in the winter season; and baseball, softball, track & field, and golf in the spring season. The school has also offered swimming and dance in the past but has not fielded teams in recent years due to lack of interest.

The Meadows School also offers many of the same interscholastic sports at the Middle School level as a member of the  Red Rock Athletic Conference.

References 

Educational institutions established in 1984
High schools in Las Vegas
Private high schools in Nevada
Private elementary schools in Nevada
Private middle schools in Nevada
Buildings and structures in Summerlin, Nevada
Schools in Las Vegas
Preparatory schools in Nevada
1984 establishments in Nevada